Habung Payeng (born 1 January 1958) is a former Information Commissioner in Arunachal Pradesh and a member of the National Executive of Aam Aadmi Party. He contested 2014 Lok Sabha elections from Arunachal West constituency. Before becoming the Information Commissioner, Payeng worked as a lecturer of economics in J.N. College, Pasighat, Arunachal Pradesh. He has also worked as a newsreader and translator in All India Radio and as an editor for 'The Arunachal News', an English weekly paper Published from Itanagar.

Education
Payeng was born on 1 January 1958. He graduated from St. Edmund's College Shillong and his master's degree in Economics and M.Phil. in Sociology from J.N.U. New Delhi.

Professional career
Payeng was previously employed as the State Information Commissioner in the Arunachal Pradesh Information Commission. Prior to this, he was a lecturer of economics in J.N. College, Pasighat. He has also worked as a District Research Officer in the Government of Arunachal Pradesh and served as the Director of the North East Handloom and Handicraft Development Cooperation. He was a member of the North East Regional Advisory Committee of Small Industrial Bank of India and was on the boards of the Small Scale Industries, Arunachal Pradesh, Standing Committee on North East and Hill States Industrial development and the Telecom Advisory Committee, SSA of Arunachal Pradesh.

Publications
He has published a book entitled Economic and Social Change in North East in 1988. He has also written and edited many souvenir articles and features.

References

Living people
1958 births
Aam Aadmi Party candidates in the 2014 Indian general election
Aam Aadmi Party politicians
21st-century Indian politicians